Exter  is a suburb of the town Vlotho in the district of Herford, in North Rhine-Westphalia, Germany. Exter has a population of just over 3,000 (June 2007) and makes up the westernmost part of the town Vlotho.

Location 

Exter borders on Herford in the west, Löhne and Bad Oeynhausen (both Minden-Lübbecke district) in the north, the suburb Valdorf of Vlotho in the east, and Bad Salzuflen (Lippe district) in the south. Bundesautobahn 2 goes through the village.

The highest point is the Steinegge at 255.5 m, the lowest point is at Hagenmühle at 99.6 m.

History 
The name Exter was first mentioned in the 12th century in a document of the convent in Herford.

Attractions 
The windmill built in 1850 in Solterwisch has been renovated and is fully functional.

The , built in 1666, was consecrated as the first Evangelical highway church in Germany in 1959.

References

External links 
Geschichtswerkstatt Exter  historical society of Exter

Former municipalities in North Rhine-Westphalia
Herford (district)